Fortune Favors the Brave (literally "The Genie of the Bells, or the Bellringer's Son") was a 1908 French silent fantasy film directed by Georges Méliès.

Plot
A young boy's adventure takes him to the domain of the Genie of the Cathedral Bell, where he finds a fortune to enrich his family.

Production
A surviving production still reveals that Méliès appears in the film as a gnome; his son, André Méliès, plays the young boy.

Release and reception
The film was released by Méliès's Star Film Company and is numbered 1394–1407 in its catalogues.

The New York Mirror gave the film a brief review after its American release in December 1909, saying that it "will please the children, who will not be too critical of the stage management."

The film is currently presumed lost.

References

External links

1908 films
Films directed by Georges Méliès
Lost French films
French silent short films
French black-and-white films
French fantasy films
1900s fantasy films
1908 lost films
1908 short films
1900s French films